James M. Calhoun (February 12, 1811October 1, 1875) was an American politician who served as the sixteenth mayor of Atlanta, Georgia during the American Civil War, best known as the recipient of Union General William T. Sherman's famous "war is cruelty" (often misquoted as "war is hell") letter.

Early life and education
Calhoun was born in South Carolina; his father was a cousin of Democrat John C. Calhoun. After the death of his parents when he was 18, he moved to Decatur, Georgia to live with his older brother Ezkiel N. Calhoun who was a lawyer. He began studying law in 1831 and passed the bar February 22, 1832. Politically, Calhoun was a Whig in a largely Democratic district but was still elected to the Georgia General Assembly in 1837 from DeKalb County, and to the State Senate in 1851.

Career

Mayor of Atlanta
In 1852, Calhoun moved to Atlanta, where ten years later he served four one-year terms as its mayor.

In 1863, he commissioned a volunteer militia to defend his city.  When Union troops under the command of William T. Sherman drew near during the Atlanta campaign, much of the population of Atlanta, including Calhoun's wife and children, fled the city.  This reduced the population of Atlanta from around 22,000 to less than 3,000 when the Confederate Army of Tennessee retreated from the city on September 1, 1864.

Calhoun surrendered the city to Union forces under Sherman on September 2, 1864, writing, "Sir: The fortune of war has placed Atlanta in your hands. As mayor of the city I ask protection of non-combatants and private property." A marker now stands at the corner of Peachtree Street and Alabama Street indicating where the surrender took place. Sherman replied by ordering the evacuation of the remaining civilian population of Atlanta on September 7, 1864. Calhoun and the city council protested this order, claiming that most of those who had not fled could not leave on account of their age, sickness, pregnancy, or destitution. In response, Sherman wrote back, accusing the Confederates of hypocrisy for invading Union territory and inflicting pains on American citizens, but only complaining when the reverse was done to them:

Union soldiers under Sherman occupied the city for two months and burned much of it on November 15, 1864, in preparation for the March to the Sea.

Burial place
Calhoun is buried in Oakland Cemetery. His son, William Lowndes Calhoun, served as Atlanta's mayor in the 1870s.

External links
Correspondence between Sherman, Calhoun, and others regarding the evacuation of Atlanta

1811 births
1875 deaths
Mayors of Atlanta
People of Georgia (U.S. state) in the American Civil War
Calhoun family
Georgia (U.S. state) Whigs
19th-century American politicians
Burials at Oakland Cemetery (Atlanta)